Hussain Abdulrahman (Arabic:حسين عبد الرحمن) (born 31 October 1994) is an Emirati footballer who plays as a midfielder for Ajman.

Career

Dubai
Hussain Abdulrahman started his career at Dubai and is a product of the Dubai's youth system. On 10 May 2014, Hussain Abdulrahman made his professional debut for Dubai against Al-Nasr in the Pro League, replacing Jehad Al-Hussain.

Ajman
On 17 August 2017, left Dubai and signed with Ajman. On 15 September 2017, Hussain Abdulrahman made his professional debut for Ajman against Al-Jazira in the Pro League.

External links

References

1994 births
Living people
Emirati footballers
Dubai CSC players
Ajman Club players
UAE Pro League players
UAE First Division League players
Association football midfielders
Place of birth missing (living people)